Francesca Hung (born 25 April 1994) is an Australian actress, model, and beauty pageant titleholder who was crowned Miss Universe Australia 2018. She represented Australia at Miss Universe 2018, where she finished as a wildcard in the Top 20.

Personal life 

She is from the Northern Beaches of Sydney and is the daughter of Chinese Australian father and an Irish Australian mother. She is a professional model. She is studying for a Masters's in publishing at the University of Sydney after completing an undergraduate degree in arts and sociology.

Pageantry

Miss Universe Australia 2018 
Hung has crowned Miss Universe Australia 2018 pageant and she won as Miss Universe Australia 2018.

References

External links
missuniverse.com

Living people
1994 births
Australian models of Chinese descent
Australian models of Irish descent
Australian people of Irish descent
Australian female models
Australian beauty pageant winners
Models from Sydney
Miss Universe Australia winners
Miss Universe 2018 contestants